Moulin Quignon, a quarry near Abbeville, France, celebrated for the discovery in 1863 by Boucher de Perthes of a human jawbone believed to be referable to the Quaternary period.

By his collection of flints Boucher de Perthes had been the first to attempt to establish the existence of man in remote ages; but it had been objected that if the flints were indeed the work of man, human remains would have been found in association with them.

Considerable excitement therefore was created both in England and France by the "find" of bones at Moulin Quignon, and a commission of inquiry was appointed. The report was favourable to the genuineness of the relics, but latterly doubts have arisen as to whether they can be regarded as earlier than the Neolithic age.

References

Further reading
 Pierre Antoine, Marie-Hélène Moncel, Nicole Limondin-Lozouet, Jean-Luc Locht et al.: Palaeoenvironment and dating of the Early Acheulean localities from the Somme River basin (Northern France): New discoveries from the High Terrace at Abbeville-Carrière Carpentier. In: Quaternary Science Reviews. Band 149, 2016, pp. 338–371, doi:10.1016/j.quascirev.2016.07.035.
Jacques Boucher de Perthes: Antiquités celtiques et antédiluviennes. Mémoire sur l'industrie primitive et les arts à leur origine. Paris: Treuttel et Wurtz, 1847, full text
Charles Lyell: Geological Evidences of the Antiquity of Man. London: Murray, 1863.
Pierre Antoine, Marie-Hélène Moncel, Pierre Voinchet et al.: The earliest evidence of Acheulian occupation in Northwest Europe and the rediscovery of the Moulin Quignon site, Somme valley, France. In: Scientific Reports vol. 9, Article 13091, 2019, doi:10.1038/s41598-019-49400-w.
Marie-Hélène Moncel, Rachel Orliac, Patrick Auguste & Carole Vercoutère: La séquence de Moulin Quignon est-elle une séquence archéologique ? In: L'Anthropologie vol. 120, Nr. 4, 2016, pp. 369–388, doi:10.1016/j.anthro.2016.05.008
Arnaud Hurel, Jean-Jacques Bahain, Marie-Hélène Moncel et al.: Moulin Quignon: la redécouverte d’un site. In: L'Anthropologie vol. 120, Nr. 4, 2016, pp. 428–438, doi:10.1016/j.anthro.2016.05.007

Prehistoric sites in France
Geography of Somme (department)